The 1985 Livingston Open was a men's tennis tournament played on outdoor hard courts that was part of the 1985 Nabisco Grand Prix. It was played at Newark Academy in Livingston, New Jersey in the United States from July 22 through July 29, 1985. Second-seeded Brad Gilbert won the singles title.

Finals

Singles

 Brad Gilbert defeated  Brian Teacher 4–6, 7–5, 6–0
 It was Gilbert's 1st singles title of the year and the 4th of his career.

Doubles

 Mike De Palmer /  Peter Doohan defeated  Eddie Edwards /  Danie Visser 6–3, 6–4
 It was de Palmer's 1st title of the year and the 1st of his career. It was Doohan's 2nd title of the year and the 4th of his career.

References

External links
 ITF tournament edition details

 
Livingston Open
Livingston Open
Livingston Open